Deer Pond is a small lake north of the hamlet of Little Rapids in Herkimer County, New York. It drains north via an unnamed creek that flows into Oswegatchie River.

See also
 List of lakes in New York

References 

Lakes of New York (state)
Lakes of Herkimer County, New York